The  Sts. Peter and Paul Church is a Catholic church in Ruwi, in the city of Muscat, the capital and largest city of the Sultanate of Oman, south of the Arabian Peninsula. This is one of the two Catholic churches found in the city, the other being dedicated to the Holy Spirit in the sector of Ghala.

The temple follows the Roman or Latin rite and depends on the Apostolic Vicariate of Southern Arabia (Apostolicus Vicariatus Arabiae Meridionalis or  النيابة الرسولية من جنوب الجزيرة العربية). The original church was consecrated by Cardinal Simon Lourduswamy on April 4, 1977,  thanks to a donation of land's own Sultan of Oman and religious tolerance in the country. Most of those who come to church are expatriate workers who began arriving to the place from twentieth century. Due to the increase of the congregation, the church was expanded with funds from the faithful and reopened in 1995.

See also
 Catholic Church in Oman

References

1977 establishments in Oman
Roman Catholic churches completed in 1977
Roman Catholic churches in Oman
Buildings and structures in Muscat, Oman
20th-century Roman Catholic church buildings
Apostolic Vicariate of Southern Arabia
Catholic Church in the Arabian Peninsula